Faul is a surname. Notable people with the surname include:

Bill Faul (born 1909-1974), Australian rules footballer
Bill Faul (baseball) (1940–2002), American baseball pitcher from Cincinnati, Ohio
Denis Faul (1932–2006), Irish Roman Catholic priest
Jan Faul, photographer
Michelle Faul, AP Reporter, West Africa, Ebola
Sumari Faul, Mother of the South African group, Meerkatte (also known as Más Gatos). Also referred to as Sueña Perezoso.

See also 

FAUL, part of the music duo formation Faul & Wad Ad
 Fauls Green, village in Shropshire, England
 Paul is dead